Wesley Dennis (born April 22, 1963, in Clanton, Alabama) is an American country music artist. A native of Alabama, Dennis previously held a job installing car windshields before he took to singing in bars. In 1995, he signed to Mercury Nashville Records, releasing a self-titled debut album, and charting three singles on the Billboard Hot Country Songs charts. He also toured with Alan Jackson that same year.

Dennis's debut album was produced by Keith Stegall, who has also produced for Jackson, and was released on March 7, 1995, to mostly favorable reviews. New Country magazine critic Chris Dickinson gave it three-and-a-half stars out of five, calling him "as honestly neo-trad as they come", although he said that the tracks "This Hat Ain't No Act" and "Bubbaland" were "dime-a-gross." USA Today also gave a favorable review, comparing Dennis' vocals to those of Keith Whitley, but criticizing "This Hat Ain't No Act" as a "trite" song.

Discography

Albums

Singles

Music videos

References

External links
Wesley Dennis on Myspace

1963 births
People from Clanton, Alabama
American country singer-songwriters
Living people
Mercury Records artists
Country musicians from Alabama
Singer-songwriters from Alabama